The Nkomazi Local Municipality is a Local Municipality in Mpumalanga, South Africa. The council consists of sixty-five members elected by mixed-member proportional representation. Thirty-three councillors are elected by first-past-the-post voting in thirty-three wards, while the remaining thirty-two are chosen from party lists so that the total number of party representatives is proportional to the number of votes received. In the election of 1 November 2021 the African National Congress (ANC) won a majority of fifty seats.

Results 
The following table shows the composition of the council after past elections.

December 2000 election

The following table shows the results of the 2000 election.

March 2006 election

The following table shows the results of the 2006 election.

May 2011 election

The following table shows the results of the 2011 election.

August 2016 election

The following table shows the results of the 2016 election.

November 2021 election

The following table shows the results of the 2021 election.

By-elections from November 2021
The following by-elections were held to fill vacant ward seats in the period from November 2021. A number of ANC councillors were expelled by the party after working with the EFF to elect Johan Mkhatshwa, former mayor and the top-ranked ANC candidate on the proportional list, elected as mayor. The ANC candidates won both available seats in the August by-elections, although the party received less than 50% of the votes in ward 10. The EFF won the October by-election in ward 11, its first ward win in the province.

References

Nkomazi